The BTBA Nationals (also known as the BTBA National Championships) is a ten-pin bowling national championship tournament held in the United Kingdom by the British Tenpin Bowling Association (BTBA). It is also sanctioned and governed by the BTBA and is held annually in March, since its inaugural inception match in 1961.

History
The BTBA Nationals tournament itself is open only to those who are members of the BTBA, in order to compete for the national championship.

The BTBA Nationals has a number of categories and levels and is open to both men and women in singles, doubles and team categories in three divisions (A, B and C).

Past events
 2008 event
 2007 event
 2006 event
 2005 event
 2004 event
 2003 event
 2002 event
 2001 event

External links
Official BTBA Nationals site
BTBA's The Way It Works
Bowlinglinks all over the World, sorted by categories

Ten-pin bowling competitions in the United Kingdom